Following is a list of senators of Marne, people who have represented the department of Marne in the Senate of France.

Third Republic

Senators for Marne under the French Third Republic were:

 Alfred Boissonnet (1876–1879)
 Simon Dauphinot (1876–1888)
 Désiré Médéric Le Blond (1879–1886)
 Victor Diancourt (1886–1906)
 Camille Margaine (1888–1893)
 Alfred Poirrier (1894–1898)
 Ernest Vallé (1898–1920)
 Léon Bourgeois (1905–1925)
 Ernest Monfeuillart (1906–1933)
 Henry Merlin (1920–1940)
 Ernest Haudos (1925–1933)
 Jean Jacquy (1933–1940)
 Henri Patizel (1933–1940)

Fourth Republic

Senators for Marne under the French Fourth Republic were:

 Alcide Benoît (1946–1948)
 Roger Menu (1946–1959)
 Marcel Lemaire (1948–1959)

Fifth Republic 
Senators for Marne under the French Fifth Republic were:

References

Sources

 
Marne